Sedki Sobhy Sayyid Ahmad (  ) (born 12 December 1955) is an Egyptian politician and former General who was Minister of Defence of Egypt from 2014 until 2018. Sobhy previously served as the Chief of Staff of the Armed Forces from August 2012 to March 2014. He was sworn in as Minister of Defence in March 2014 after Abdul Fattah al-Sisi resigned so he could stand for the presidency. He also commanded the Third Army for a time.

Military education
 Bachelor of military sciences, Egyptian Military Academy
 The Advanced course, Egyptian Military Academy 
 The sophisticated course, Egyptian Military Academy 
 M.A. of Military sciences, Egyptian Joint Command and staff college 
 War Course, Fellowship of the Higher War College, Nasser's Military Sciences Academy 
 Basic Infantry scholarship, United States 
 Advanced Infantry scholarship, United States 
 Training planning course, United States 
 War Course, US Army War College, United States 
 Multinational forces course, Germany

Main commands
 Mechanized Infantry Battalion, Commander. 
 Mechanized Infantry Brigade, Chief of staff. 
 Mechanized Infantry Brigade, Commander. 
 Mechanized Infantry Division, Chief of Staff. 
 Mechanized Infantry Division, commander. 
 Third Army, Chief, Operations branch. 
 Third Army, Chief of Staff. 
 Third Army, Commander.

Connections with the United States

In 2004–2005 Sedki Sobhy studied for a Master's Degree in Strategic Studies at the US Army War College in Carlisle, Pennsylvania. While there he wrote a paper recommending that the United States withdraw its military from the Middle East and concentrate instead on socio-economic aid for the region. The paper was posted on a US Department of Defense website, where it was noticed by analyst Issandr El Amrani.

After the 2013 Egyptian coup, Sedki Sobhy spoke by telephone on 4 July 2013 with Martin Dempsey, US Chairman of the Joint Chiefs of Staff, and had spoken twice with him by 8 July.

Medals and decorations
 25 April Decoration (Liberation of Sinai) 
 Distinguished Service Decoration 
 Military Duty Decoration, Second Class 
 Military Duty Decoration, First Class 
 Longevity and Exemplary Medal 
 Liberation of Kuwait Medal 
 Silver Jubilee of October War Medal 
 Golden Jubilee of the 23rd of July Revolution 
 Silver Jubilee of the Liberation of Sinai Medal 
 25 January Revolution Medal

References

|-

|-

1955 births
Living people
Chiefs of the General Staff (Egypt)
Defence Ministers of Egypt
Egyptian Military Academy alumni
21st-century Egyptian politicians